The Last Templar is a three-hour Canadian television miniseries based on the 2005 novel The Last Templar, which aired in the U.S. on January 25 and 26, 2009, starring Mira Sorvino, Scott Foley, Victor Garber, Anthony Lemke, Kenneth Welsh, Danny Blanco Hall and Omar Sharif. The miniseries is produced by Muse Entertainment Enterprises. Emmy Award-winning Robert Halmi Sr. (who produced the Gulliver's Travels miniseries), along with Robert Halmi Jr. (The Poseidon Adventure), and Michael Prupas are the executive producers.

Plot
At the New York Metropolitan Museum, four horsemen dressed as 12th-century knights storm the gala opening of an exhibition of Vatican treasures and steal an arcane medieval decoder. Archaeologist Tess Chaykin (Mira Sorvino) and FBI agent Sean Daley (Scott Foley) engage in a chase across three continents in search of the enemy and the lost secret of the Knights Templar.

Cast
 Mira Sorvino as Tess Chaykin
 Scott Foley as Agent Sean Daley
 Victor Garber as Monsignor De Angelis
 Stéphane Demers as Knights Templar Martin

References

External links

2009 films
English-language Canadian films
Sonar Entertainment miniseries
2000s Canadian television miniseries
Television series by Muse Entertainment
Films directed by Paolo Barzman